Marinari is an Italian surname. Notable people with the surname include:

Antonio Marinari (1605–1689), Italian Roman Catholic prelate
Onorio Marinari (1627–1715), Italian painter and printmaker 

Italian-language surnames